Chishty bin Subh-o-Mujahid (born 1944), commonly known as Chisty Mujahid, is a Pakistani cricket commentator who also played at club level cricket. He also served as Director of Pakistan Cricket Board from 2002 to 2003.

Early life
Chishty was born on 17 January 1944 in Delhi, British Raj to a father who was a government employee. His family migrated to Karachi from Allahabad after the establishment of Pakistan.

Education and career
He was educated at Karachi Grammar School, then the National College Karachi, and later at Selwyn College, Cambridge. He began Pakistani radio commentaries in 1967 and television commentaries in 1970. Chishty has also commentated for outside the country.

Awards
In 1986, he was awarded PTV best sports commentator. He won the Radio Pakistan best cricket commentator award in 1999 and excellence award in 2001. Chishty is the recipient of Pride of Performance 2003 for cricket broadcasting and telecasting.

References

1944 births
Alumni of Selwyn College, Cambridge
Karachi Grammar School alumni
People from Delhi
Pakistani cricket commentators
Recipients of the Pride of Performance
Cricketers from Karachi
Living people
Muhajir people